George Joseph Burns (born March 13, 1918 in New York City – died July 17, 2007, in West Hills, Los Angeles, California) was an American character actor. He is known mostly for playing Pat Chambers on the 1959 Mickey Spillane's Mike Hammer television show and for numerous of appearances on American television series, such as Gunsmoke.   He was survived by his wife Fern; three sons Brendan, Timothy and Sean; daughter Siobhan and a granddaughter.

Early life
The son of a New York City Police Department inspector, Burns attended Cornell University and Columbia University.  Following the attack on Pearl Harbor, Burns enlisted in the United States Marine Corps. Commissioned through Officer Candidate School, Lt. Burns was assigned to the 4th Marine Division and fought in the Battle of Kwajalein, Battle of Saipan, and the Battle of Iwo Jima where Burns earned two Purple Hearts. During the latter he was a captain and company commander of "A" Company First Battalion 25th Marines and was awarded the Silver Star Medal. Captain Burns located an enemy strongpoint and personally guided a tank in to destroy the emplacement. Burns' two brothers were also captains, one in the army and one in the Marine Corps.

Acting career
In 1947 Burns changed his first name to avoid confusion with comedian George Burns.  He made his Broadway debut in the original production of Mister Roberts alongside Henry Fonda.

Burns began appearing on American television in 1953 including appearing in the original 1954 television broadcast of Twelve Angry Men.  During his acting career he befriended Ernest Borgnine where he supervised Ernest repainting scenery.  Borgnine recalled that during the 1950s Burns was rejected from the lead of a show, eventually finding out it was due to his befriending suspected communists. Burns brought his medals and captains bars to the producers and shouted "Does this look like I'm a goddammned communist?"  He did not get the part.

Burns made his motion picture debut in the 1956 war film Between Heaven and Hell.  He also wrote several of the Kilroy episodes of The Wonderful World of Color for Walt Disney.

Partial filmography

1956: Between Heaven and Hell – Pvt. Raker – Co. G
1957: Fear Strikes Out – Joe Cronin (uncredited)
1957-1958: Official Detective (TV Series) – Donahue
1957: The Walter Winchell File (1957, Episode: "The Law and Aaron Benjamin") – Berliss Posada
1960: Tall Story – District Attorney Davis
1964: Seven Days in May – Secret Service Director Corwin
1969: Number One – Ed Davis
1970: There Was a Crooked Man... – Dr. Loomis
1971: Earth II (TV Movie) – Steiner
1973: The Iceman Cometh – Lieb
1974: The Nickel Ride – Elias
1976: Helter Skelter – Frank Fowles
1980: Seed of Innocence – Ray Crocker
1982: Frances – Ernest Farmer
1983: Money to Burn – Bank Guard
1986: Legal Eagles – Judge #1
1988: Fear – Link Reilley (final film role)

References

External links
 

 

1918 births
2007 deaths
Male actors from New York City
American male film actors
American male television actors
United States Marine Corps officers
Recipients of the Silver Star
Cornell University alumni
United States Marine Corps personnel of World War II
20th-century American male actors
Burials at Westwood Village Memorial Park Cemetery
American male stage actors